is a railway station on the Kyūdai Main Line operated by JR Kyushu in Hita, Ōita Prefecture, Japan.

Lines

Layout 
The station consists of a side platform platform a single track at grade. The unstaffed station building is a modern structure which shares facilities with the local volunteer fire brigade. A short flight of steps lead up to the platform which has a weather shelter.

Adjacent stations

History
The Daito Railway was nationalized in 1922, after which Japanese Government Railways (JGR) undertook phased westward expansion of the track which, at the time, it had designated as the Daito Line. On 15 November 1934, a link up was achieved between Hita and Amagase, and the entire stretch from Kurume to Ōita was now designated as the Kyudai Main Line. Bungo-Miyoshi opened on the same day as an intermediate station between Hita and Amagase. With the privatization of Japanese National Railways (JNR), the successor of JGR, on 1 April 1987, JR Kyushu took over control of the station.

Passenger statistics
In fiscal 2015, there were a total of 2,334 boarding passengers, giving a daily average of 6 passengers.

See also
 List of railway stations in Japan

References

External links
Bungo-Miyoshi (JR Kyushu)

Railway stations in Ōita Prefecture
Railway stations in Japan opened in 1934